Ormosia cruenta is a species of flowering plant in the family Fabaceae. It is found in Panama and Costa Rica.

References

cruenta
Flora of Panama
Data deficient plants
Taxonomy articles created by Polbot